Armistead Mason Dobie (April 15, 1881 – August 7, 1962) was a law professor, Dean of the University of Virginia School of Law, United States circuit judge of the United States Court of Appeals for the Fourth Circuit and United States District Judge of the United States District Court for the Western District of Virginia.

Education and career

Born in Norfolk, Virginia, Dobie received a Bachelor of Arts degree from the University of Virginia in 1901, a Master of Arts degree from the same institution in 1902, and a Bachelor of Laws from the University of Virginia School of Law in 1904. He was in private practice in St. Louis, Missouri from 1904 to 1907, serving as an adjunct professor at the University of Virginia School of Law in 1907, and as a full professor from 1909 to 1939. Dobie served in France as assistant chief of staff of the 80th Division of the United States Army during World War I from 1917 to 1919. He returned to the University of Virginia School of Law and served as its Dean from 1932 to 1939. Dobie "is credited with first introducing the case method of instruction to Virginia." He was widely published on a variety of legal and non-legal topics, and was an expert on federal court jurisdiction, and a member of the original drafting committee of the Federal Rules of Civil Procedure.

University lectures and participation

In his years at the University, Dobie was an enthusiastic and inspirational figure: "Judge Dobie's lectures became public events at the University. His annual Easter lecture became known as the 'Dobie lecture,' and law students often brought dates to the event to hear the master orator working his unique magic with the English language. . . . Judge Dobie had a remarkable spirit and tirelessly involved himself in the events of the University. For instance, Judge Dobie often gave pep talks to the football team before its Homecoming games."

Federal judicial service

A dispute between Franklin D. Roosevelt and Virginia's senators Carter Glass and Harry F. Byrd Sr., resulted in the rejection of Roosevelt's recess appointment of Floyd H. Roberts to a newly created seat on the United States District Court for the Western District of Virginia. Then Solicitor General Robert H. Jackson recalled that Roosevelt "thought Glass and Byrd would support Dobie and thereby break the deadlock without loss of face to anybody." Moreover, Roosevelt authorized Jackson to put out the word that Roosevelt would support Dobie for an upcoming vacancy on the United States Court of Appeals for the Fourth Circuit. When Jackson went to meet with Dobie at the Farmington Country Club, Dobie agreed to the President's offer, and soon thereafter Senators Glass and Byrd offered their support. Another account relates Judge Dobie's appointment this way: "Years earlier, Roosevelt's son wanted to attend the University of Virginia, and Judge Dobie helped him gain admission. Thus, although Roosevelt had previously promised the next Fourth Circuit opening to Senator Byrnes of South Carolina, the President had to back out of that promise in order to reward Judge Dobie for his efforts on behalf of Roosevelt's son."

Dobie was nominated by President Franklin D. Roosevelt on May 16, 1939, to a seat on the United States District Court for the Western District of Virginia vacated by Judge Floyd H. Roberts. He was confirmed by the United States Senate on May 25, 1939, and received his commission on June 2, 1939. His service terminated on February 8, 1940, due to his elevation to the Fourth Circuit.

Dobie received a recess appointment from President Franklin D. Roosevelt on December 19, 1939, to a seat on the United States Court of Appeals for the Fourth Circuit vacated by Judge Elliott Northcutt. He was nominated to the same position by President Franklin D. Roosevelt on January 11, 1940. He was confirmed by the United States Senate on February 1, 1940, and received his commission on February 5, 1940. He assumed senior status on February 1, 1956. His service terminated on August 7, 1962, due to his death.

Fourth Circuit service

On the Court of Appeals, Dobie worked with Judges John J. Parker and Morris Ames Soper. Their civil rights decisions included Alston v. School Board. A fourth seat on the Court was not added until 1961. "Judge Dobie sat for over 1400 Fourth Circuit cases, yet he authored only six dissents. However, as a remarkable testament to Judge Dobie's legal mind, the United States Supreme Court adopted the reasoning of four of his six dissents when the Court subsequently overruled the Fourth Circuit majority in those particular cases."

Death and legacy

Dobie died August 7, 1962, in Charlottesville, Virginia. "A bachelor until just four years before his death, Judge Dobie spent his entire life thoroughly engrossed in the noble endeavor to learn, interpret, and apply the law to the daily lives of the people who came before his court. Apparent from his many decisions, the praise of his colleagues, and the admiration of the students he taught, Judge Dobie's love of the law permeated and influenced countless lives. As John S. Battle, the former Governor of Virginia and student of Judge Dobie, stated at a memorial for Judge Dobie in the Fourth Circuit courtroom in 1963, 'Judge Dobie is not dead; thousands of students of the law who sat at his feet will not forget him, and the learned opinions he wrote while a member of [the Fourth Circuit] will not die.'"

References

External links
 
 
 University of Virginia Law School, Inventory of the Papers of Armistead Mason Dobie

1881 births
1962 deaths
University of Virginia alumni
University of Virginia School of Law alumni
Virginia lawyers
Judges of the United States District Court for the Western District of Virginia
United States district court judges appointed by Franklin D. Roosevelt
Judges of the United States Court of Appeals for the Fourth Circuit
United States court of appeals judges appointed by Franklin D. Roosevelt
20th-century American judges
United States Army officers